The 2016–17 season was Maccabi Haifa's 59th season in Israeli Premier League, and their 35th consecutive season in the top division of Israeli football.

Club

Kits

 Provider: Nike, Inc.
 Main sponsor: Honda
 Secondary sponsor: Pointer and Variety Israel

Squad information

Current coaching staff
{|class="wikitable"
|+
! style="background-color:#FFFFFF; color:#000000;" scope="col"|Position
! style="background-color:#FFFFFF; color:#000000;" scope="col"|Staff
|-

Transfers

Transfers in

Total spending:  3,160,000 €

Transfers out

Total Income : 1,829,000 €

Players out on loan

Pre-season and friendlies

Competitions

Overall

Overview

Ligat Ha'Al

Regular season

Regular season table

Play-off

Championship round table

Results summary

Results by round

State Cup

Round of 32

Toto Cup

Group stage

Quarter-final

Israel Super Cup

Europa League

Second qualifying round

Statistics

Squad statistics

Updated on 18 March 2017

Goals

Updated on 17 March 2017

Clean sheets

Updated on 17 March 2017

Disciplinary record

Updated on 17 March 2017

Suspensions

Overall

{| class="wikitable" style="text-align: center"
|-
!
!Total
!Home
!Away
!Natural
|-
|align=left| Games played          || 36 || 18 || 17 || 1
|-
|align=left| Games won             || 13 || 7 || 6 || -
|- 
|align=left| Games drawn          || 12 || 6 || 6 || bgcolor=darkgrey|
|-
|align=left| Games lost            || 11 || 6 || 4 || 1
|-
|align=left| Biggest win            || 5–0 vs Hapoel Ashkelon || 5–0 vs Hapoel Ashkelon   || 2–0 vs Maccabi Tel Aviv2–0 vs Hapoel Kfar Saba || -
|-
|align=left| Biggest loss      || 0-3 vs Hapoel Haifa || 0-3 vs Hapoel Haifa  || 0–2 vs Hapoel Be'er Sheva || 2–4 vs Hapoel Be'er Sheva
|-
|align=left| Biggest win (League)   || 5–0 vs Hapoel Ashkelon  || 5–0 vs Hapoel Ashkelon   || 2–0 vs Maccabi Tel Aviv2–0 vs Hapoel Kfar Saba || bgcolor=darkgrey|
|-
|align=left| Biggest loss (League)  || 0-3 vs Hapoel Haifa || 0-3 vs Hapoel Haifa || 0–2 vs Hapoel Be'er Sheva  || bgcolor=darkgrey|
|-
|align=left| Biggest win (Cup)    || - || - || - || - 
|-
|align=left| Biggest loss (Cup)     || 0–2 vs Maccabi Petah Tikva || 0–2 vs Maccabi Petah Tikva || - || -
|-
|align=left| Biggest win (Toto)    || 3–2 vs Hapoel Kfar Saba 2–1 vs Bnei Sakhnin 1–0 vs Hapoel Haifa || 2–1 vs Bnei Sakhnin 1–0 vs Hapoel Haifa  || 3–2 vs Hapoel Kfar Saba || -
|-
|align=left| Biggest loss (Toto)  || 1–2 vs Hapoel Be'er Sheva || - || 1–2 vs Hapoel Be'er Sheva ||  
|-
|align=left| Biggest win (Suprcup)    || - || bgcolor=darkgrey| || bgcolor=darkgrey|  || -
|-
|align=left| Biggest loss (Suprcup)  || 2–4 vs Hapoel Be'er Sheva || bgcolor=darkgrey| || bgcolor=darkgrey| || 2–4 vs Hapoel Be'er Sheva
|-
|align=left| Biggest win (Europa)    || - || - || - || - 
|-
|align=left| Biggest loss (Europa)  || - || - || - || -   
|-
|align=left| Goals scored          || 43 || 22 || 19 || 2
|-
|align=left| Goals conceded        || 40 || 20 || 16 || 4
|-
|align=left| Goal difference        || 3 || 2 || 3 || -2
|-
|align=left| Clean sheets           || 13 || 6 || 7 || 0
|-
|-
|-
|align=left| Yellow cards         || 75 || 34 || 37 || 4
|-
|align=left| Red cards              || 4 || 2 || 2 || -
|-
|align=left| Most appearances      ||colspan=4|  Gary Kagelmacher (33)
|-
|align=left| Most minutes played   || colspan=4|  Gary Kagelmacher (3,069)
|-
|align=left| Most goals        || colspan=4| Eliran Atar and Gili Vermouth (7)
|-
|align=left|Penalties for  || 13 || 7 || 6 || -
|-
|align=left|Penalties against  || 1 || - || 1 || -
|-
|align=left| Winning rate        || % || % || %  || %
|-

References

External links
 Maccabi Haifa website

Maccabi Haifa F.C. seasons
Maccabi Haifa